These are tables of congressional delegations from the State of Texas to the United States Senate and United States House of Representatives.

The current deans of the Texas delegation are Representatives Sheila Jackson Lee (TX-18) and Lloyd Doggett (TX-37), having both served in the House since 1995.

Republicans have complete control of the congressional redistricting process in Texas, as any new maps are drawn and passed by the Republican-held state legislature and signed into law by the Republican governor.

U.S. House of Representatives

Current districts and representatives
The delegation consists of 38 members, with 25 Republicans and 13 Democrats.

Recent historical district boundaries 
Below is a table of United States congressional district boundary maps for the State of Texas, presented chronologically. All 10 redistricting events that took place in Texas in the decades between 1973 and 2013 are illustrated here.

1845 to 1863: 2 seats 
Upon statehood, Texas was apportioned two seats.

1863 to 1873: 4 seats 
After the 1860 United States census, Texas gained two seats.

1873 to 1883: 6 seats 
After the 1870 United States census, Texas gained two seats. At first, the state used at-large seats, but after 1875 all the seats were districted.

1883 to 1893: 11 seats 
After the 1880 United States census, Texas gained five seats.

1893 to 1903: 13 seats 
After the 1890 United States census, Texas gained two seats.

1903 to 1913: 16 seats 
After the 1900 United States census, Texas gained three seats.

1913 to 1933: 18 seats 
After the 1910 United States census, Texas gained two seats. At first, they were elected at-large, but starting in 1919 all were districted. There was not a reapportionment after the 1920 United States census.

1933 to 1953: 21 seats 
After the 1930 United States census, Texas gained three seats. At first, they were elected at-large, but starting in 1935 all were districted. There was no reapportionment after the 1940 United States census.

1953 to 1963: 22 seats 
After the 1950 United States census, Texas gained one seat. At first, it was elected at-large, but starting in 1959 all were districted.

1963 to 1973: 23 seats 
After the 1960 United States census, Texas gained one seat. At first, it was elected at-large, but starting in 1967 all were districted.

1973 to 1983: 24 seats 
After the 1970 United States census, Texas gained one seat.

1983 to 1993: 27 seats 
After the 1980 United States census, Texas gained three seats.

1993 to 2003: 30 seats 
After the 1990 United States census, Texas gained three seats.

2003 to 2013: 32 seats 
After the 2000 United States census, Texas gained two seats.

As typical, the delegation was redistricted for the 2002 elections. They were also redistricted in 2003, which gave Republicans a majority of seats after the 2004 elections.

2013 to 2023: 36 seats 
After the 2010 United States census, Texas gained four seats.

2023 to present: 38 seats 
After the 2020 United States census, Texas gained two seats.

U.S. Senate

Key

See also

List of United States congressional districts
Political party strength in Texas

References

External links
 

Texas
Politics of Texas
Congressional delegations